The University of Königsberg was the university of Königsberg in East Prussia. It was founded in 1544 as the world's second Protestant academy (after the University of Marburg) by Duke Albert of Prussia, and was commonly known as the Albertina.

Following World War II, the city of Königsberg was transferred to the Soviet Union according to the 1945 Potsdam Agreement, and renamed Kaliningrad in 1946. The Albertina was closed and the remaining non-Lithuanian population either executed or expelled, by the terms of the Potsdam Agreement. Today, the Immanuel Kant Baltic Federal University in Kaliningrad claims to maintain the traditions of the Albertina.

History

Albert, former Grand Master of the Teutonic Knights and first Duke of Prussia since 1525, had purchased a piece of land behind Königsberg Cathedral on the Kneiphof island of the Pregel River from the Samland chapter, where he had an academic gymnasium (school) erected in 1542. He issued the deed of foundation of the Collegium Albertinum on 20 July 1544, after which the university was inaugurated on 17 August. 

The newly established Protestant duchy was a fiefdom of the Crown of the Kingdom of Poland and the university served as a Lutheran counterpart to the Catholic Cracow Academy. Its first rector was the poet Georg Sabinus, son-in-law of Philipp Melanchthon. Lithuanian scholars Stanislovas Rapalionis and Abraomas Kulvietis were among the first professors of university. All professors had to take an oath on the Augsburg Confession. Since the Prussian lands lay beyond the borders of the Holy Roman Empire, both Emperor Charles V and Pope Paul III withheld their approval, nevertheless the Königsberg academy received the royal privilege by King Sigismund II Augustus of Poland on 28 March 1560.

From 1618 the Prussian duchy was ruled in personal union by the Margraves of Brandenburg and in 1657 the "Great Elector" Frederick William of Brandenburg finally acquired full sovereignty over Prussia from Poland by the Treaty of Wehlau. The Albertina was the second oldest university (after the University of Frankfurt (Oder)) and intellectual centre of Protestant Brandenburg-Prussia. Initially it comprised four colleges: Theology, Medicine, Philosophy and Law, later also natural sciences. Subsequent rectors included numerous Hohenzollern Prussian royals (at last Crown Prince William 1908–1918), who had never been to the university, usually represented by a prorector in charge of academic affairs.

The Prussian lands remained unharmed by the disastrous Thirty Years' War, which gained the Königsberg university an increasing popularity among students. In the 17th century, it was known as a home to Simon Dach, serving as rector in 1656/57, and his fellow poets. Tsar Peter I of Russia visited the Albertina in 1697, leading to increased contacts between Prussia and the Russian Empire. Large numbers of Petrine officials trooped the university to cameralist theory and administrative practices which thus shaped Russia's government. Notable Russian students at Königbserg were Kirill Razumovsky, later president of the Russian Academy of Sciences and General Mikhail Andreyevich Miloradovich. The university and the city had profound impact on the development of Lithuanian culture. The first book in Lithuanian language was printed here in 1547 and several important Lithuanian writers attended the Albertina. The university was also the preferred educational institution of the Baltic German nobility.

The 18th century is known in cultural history as the "Königsberg Century" of Enlightenment, a heyday initiated by the Albertina student Johann Christoph Gottsched and continued by the philosopher Johann Georg Hamann and writer Theodor Gottlieb von Hippel the Elder. Notable alumni were Johann Gottfried Herder, Zacharias Werner, Johann Friedrich Reichardt, E. T. A. Hoffmann, and foremost the philosopher Immanuel Kant, rector in 1786 and 1788. These scholars laid the foundations for the later Weimar Classicism and German Romanticism movements.

The Albertina magnificent botanical garden was inaugurated in 1811 during the Napoleonic Wars. Two years later, Friedrich Wilhelm Bessel established his outstanding observatory next door to the garden. Other university professors included such giants of the science world as the philosopher Johann Gottlieb Fichte (1806–07), the biologist Karl Ernst von Baer (1817–34), the mathematician Carl Gustav Jacobi (1829–42), the mineralogist Franz Ernst Neumann (1828–76) and the physicist Hermann von Helmholtz (1849–55).

In the 19th and 20th centuries, the university was most famous for its school of mathematics, founded by Carl Gustav Jacob Jacobi, and continued by his pupils Ludwig Otto Hesse, Friedrich Richelot, Johann G. Rosenhain and Philipp Ludwig von Seidel. It was later associated with the names of Hermann Minkowski (Albert Einstein's teacher), Adolf Hurwitz, Ferdinand von Lindemann and David Hilbert, who was one of the greatest modern mathematicians. The mathematicians Alfred Clebsch and Carl Gottfried Neumann (both born in Königsberg and educated under Ludwig Otto Hesse) founded the Mathematische Annalen in 1868, which soon became the most influential mathematical journal of the time.

 
 
Celebrating the university's 300 years jubilee on 31 August 1844, King Frederick William IV of Prussia laid the foundation for the new main building of the Albertina, which was inaugurated in 1862 by Crown Prince Frederick William and Prorector Johann Karl Friedrich Rosenkranz. The building on central Paradeplatz was erected in a neo-Renaissance style according to plans designed by Friedrich August Stüler. The facade was adorned by an equestrian figure in relief of Albert of Prussia. Below it were niches containing statues of the Protestant reformers Martin Luther and Philipp Melanchthon. Inside was a handsome staircase, borne by marble columns. The Senate Hall contained a portrait of Emperor Frederick III by Lauchert and a bust of Immanuel Kant by Hagemann, a student of Schadow. The adjacent hall ("Aula") was adorned with frescoes painted in 1870.
The university library was situated on Mitteltragheim in 1901 and contained over 230,000 volumes. On Dritte Fliess Strasse was the Palästra Albertina, established in 1898 for the encouragement of the higher forms of sport among the students and citizens. Nearby were the government offices, adorned with mural paintings by Knorr and Schmidt. In 1900, the university had 900 students.

During the university's last years, the Albertina faculty and the German Student Union after the territorial separation of the Province of East Prussia by the Treaty of Versailles stressed its affiliation with the Reich, pushing intellectual life towards German nationalism. On 10 July 1944, the university celebrated its 400th anniversary in presence of Reich Minister Walther Funk. A few weeks later, during the nights of 26/27 and 29/30 August, Königsberg was extensively bombed by the Royal Air Force. From January to April 1945 the city was further devastated by the East Prussian Offensive of the Red Army and the final Battle of Königsberg. When General Otto Lasch signed the capitulation on April 9, the historic inner city was destroyed by the attacks, and 80% of the university campus lay in ruins. The faculty had fled, many of them were received at the University of Göttingen.

The remaining premises including the Albertina main building were used by the Kaliningrad State Pedagogical Institute from 1948, which in 1967 received the status of a Kaliningrad State University.

Notable alumni and faculty 

Abraomas Kulvietis
Adolf Hurwitz
Adolph Eduard Grube
Arnold Sommerfeld
Carl Gustav Jacob Jacobi
Christian Goldbach (1690–1764), mathematician
Daniel Klein
Daniel Lorenz Salthenius (1701–1750), theologian
David Hilbert
E.T.A. Hoffmann
Emil Johann Wiechert
Eva Johnston
Ewald Christian von Kleist
Friedrich Ludwig Zacharias Werner
Friedrich Wilhelm Bessel
Gábor Szegő
Gotthilf Heinrich Ludwig Hagen
Gustav Kirchhoff
Hermann von Helmholtz
Hermann Minkowski
Hugo Blümner (1844–1919), classical archaeologist and philologist
Immanuel Kant
Jan Kochanowski
Johann Christoph Bohl  (1703–1785)
Johann Friedrich Herbart
Johann Gottfried Herder
Karl Ernst von Baer
Karl Rudolf König
Kristijonas Donelaitis (1714–1780), Lutheran pastor and poet 
Martynas Mažvydas
Moshe Novomeysky
Rudolf Gottschall
Ruth Moufang
Adolph Moses Radin (1848–1909), rabbi
Solomon Schonfeld (Rabbi)
Theodor Kaluza
Theophilus Siegfried Bayer

Honorary doctors 
Agnes Miegel
Wilhelm Petersen
Karl Weierstrass
Franz Liszt

See also 
List of early modern universities in Europe
University of Königsberg alumni
Academic staff of the University of Königsberg

References

External links
Search mask of the AKF (Engi, Switzerland) database for Königsberg university publications 
Daniel Heinrich Arnoldts ausführliche und mit Urkunden versehene Historie der Königsbergischen Universität. (1746, Google ebook): Transkriptions of documents from the university's early years

 
1544 establishments in Prussia
Educational institutions disestablished in 1945
Educational institutions established in the 1540s
East Prussia
Königsberg
Universities and colleges in the Polish–Lithuanian Commonwealth
Defunct universities and colleges in Germany
Immanuel Kant Baltic Federal University